Günther Nickel (born 24 March 1946 in Munich) is a German former hurdler who competed in the 1972 Summer Olympics.

References

1946 births
Living people
West German male hurdlers
Olympic athletes of West Germany
Athletes (track and field) at the 1972 Summer Olympics
Sportspeople from Munich
Universiade medalists in athletics (track and field)
Universiade silver medalists for West Germany
Medalists at the 1970 Summer Universiade